Geraldo Humberto Flores Reyes (9 December 1925 – 17 February 2022) was a Guatemalan Roman Catholic prelate.

Flores Reyes was born in Guatemala and was ordained to the priesthood in 1949. He served as titular bishop of Nova Caesaris and as auxiliary bishop of the Roman Catholic Archdiocese of Los Altos Quetzaltenango-Totonicapán, Guatemala, from 1966 to 1969, apostolic administrator of the Apostolic Vicariate of Izabal, Guatemala, from 1969 to 1977, and as bishop of the Roman Catholic Diocese of Verapaz, Guatemala, from 1971 to 2001, when he retired. Flores Reyes died on 17 February 2022, at the age of 96.

References

1925 births
2022 deaths
20th-century Roman Catholic bishops in Guatemala
21st-century Roman Catholic bishops in Guatemala
People from Quetzaltenango